Belinda Anne Irene Wright  (born 1953) is a prominent wild life photographer and wildlife conservationist in India. She is the Executive Director of the Wildlife Protection Society of India (WPSI).

Parents
Belinda's mother Anne Wright is a founder trustee of World Wide Fund for Nature (WWF) India, which she helped set up in the late 1960s. She was a member of the Tiger Task Force that was commissioned by the late Indian Prime Minister Indira Gandhi, to select nine tiger reserves for the launch of Project Tiger in 1973. She served for twenty-three years on the Indian Board for Wildlife and was closely involved with the passing of the Wild Life (Protection) Act.  Anne has also served on the wildlife boards of nine states in North East and Central India. In the early 1980s, Anne was awarded the title of Member of the Most Excellent Order of the British Empire, or MBE, for her efforts to preserve India's environmental heritage and her conservation work with the Government of India. She is currently the chairperson of the Rhino Foundation.

in 1988 Belinda's father Robert Hamilton Wright received the Officer of the Order of the British Empire or OBE for his dedicated service to British citizens in India. Bob headed the British Citizens' Association for decades and served on the board of Dr. Graham's Homes in Kalimpong in North Bengal. He spent a lot of his time working with the East India Charitable Trust, which runs old people's homes, and several charity schools and hostels. Bob was also the Chairman of a Historical Cemeteries Association and was a steward of the Royal Calcutta Turf Club for many years. Since the early 1980s, Bob's love for the wild had been nurtured by the setting-up and management of Kipling Camp. He spent time every month at the Camp. Bob Wright died on 19 April 2005.

Career
Belinda has spent her entire life in India working on wildlife issues, and is one of India's leading wildlife conservationists. She works actively to increase the dialogue and communication on Indian wildlife conservation issues, especially Indian tigers.

Belinda spent her childhood in the jungles of Bihar, particularly around the area now under Palamu Tiger Reserve. She saw her first wild tiger when she was 3 months old and photographed her first wild tiger when she was 16 years old. She worked for many years with National Geographic and made films for BBC. In 1985 she won two Emmy Awards and 14 other major international awards for her National Geographic film Land of the Tiger. To make this film she spent more than two years following the secret lives of wild tigers in Kanha Tiger Reserve and Ranthambore Tiger Reserve.

In 1994, she founded the Wildlife Protection Society of India (WPSI) with the aim of helping to avert India's wildlife crises by providing support and information to combat poaching and the escalating illegal wildlife trade – particularly wild tigers, for which Belinda has had a lifelong passion. In her capacity as WPSI's executive director, she travels the length and breadth of India to assist and support conservation efforts and to help enforce the law. In June 2003, Belinda followed in the footsteps of her parents and was appointed an OBE for her "services to the protection of wildlife and endangered species in India".

References

Indian conservationists
1953 births
Living people
Indian women environmentalists
Activists from Bihar
Women educators from Bihar
Educators from Bihar
Officers of the Order of the British Empire
20th-century Indian women
20th-century Indian people